Ongeziwe Mali (born 21 May 1999) is a South African field hockey player for the South African national team.

She participated at the 2018 Women's Hockey World Cup.

References

External links

1999 births
Living people
South African female field hockey players
Female field hockey forwards
Field hockey players at the 2018 Commonwealth Games
Commonwealth Games competitors for South Africa